In Major League Baseball (MLB), the 50 home run club is the group of batters who have hit 50 or more home runs in a single season. Babe Ruth was the first to achieve this, doing so in 1920.  By reaching the milestone, he also became the first player to hit 30 and then 40 home runs in a single season, breaking his own record of 29 from the 1919 season.  Ruth subsequently became the first player to reach the 50 home run club on four occasions, repeating the achievement in 1921, 1927, and 1928.  He remained the only player to accomplish this until Mark McGwire and Sammy Sosa matched his feat in 1999 and 2001, respectively. In doing so, they became the only players to have achieved 50 home runs in four consecutive seasons. Barry Bonds hit the most home runs to join the club, collecting 73 in 2001.  The most recent player to reach the milestone is Aaron Judge, achieving the feat for the second time during the 2022 season.

In total, 30 players have reached the 50 home run club in MLB history and nine have done so more than once.  Of these, eighteen were right-handed batters, eleven were left-handed, and one was a switch hitter, meaning he could bat from either side of the plate.  Five of these players (including three active members of the 50 home run club) have played for only one major league team.  The New York Yankees are the only franchise to have five players reach the milestone while on their roster: Ruth, Mickey Mantle, Roger Maris, Alex Rodriguez, and Aaron Judge.  Ten players are also members of the 500 home run club and two of them (Willie Mays and Rodriguez) are also members of the 3,000 hit club.  Ten players won the Most Valuable Player (MVP) Award in the same year as their 50 home run season.  Mantle is the only player to have earned the Major League Triple Crown alongside achieving 50 home runs, leading both leagues in batting average, home runs and runs batted in (RBI).  Mantle and Maris—collectively known as the M&M Boys—are the only teammates to reach the 50 home run club in the same season, hitting a combined 115 home runs in 1961 and breaking the single-season record for home runs by a pair of teammates. Albert Belle is the only player to amass 50 or more doubles in addition to attaining 50 home runs. Prince Fielder, at 23 years and 139 days, was the youngest player to reach the milestone while Bonds, at age 37, was the oldest. Pete Alonso and Aaron Judge are the only players to hit 50 home runs in their rookie seasons.

Due to the infrequent addition of members into the 50 home run club, Baseball Digest called it "a restrictive fraternity comprising slugging elite" in 1954, when there were only six members.  Of the seventeen members eligible for the Baseball Hall of Fame, eight have been elected and three were elected on the first ballot.  Eligibility requires that a player has "been retired five seasons" or deceased for at least six months, disqualifying four active players and five players who have been retired for less than five seasons.  Some believe the milestone has become less important with the large number of new members; fifteen players joined the club on a total of 24 occasions from 1995 to 2010.  Additionally, several of these recent members have had ties to performance-enhancing drugs.

Members

See also

List of Major League Baseball annual home run leaders
Major League Baseball single-season home run record
List of Major League Baseball home run records

Notes

References
General

Specific

Major League Baseball statistics
Home run club